The Burmese-Siamese War of 1563–1564, also known as the War over the White Elephants, was a war between the Toungoo dynasty of Burma and the Ayutthaya Kingdom of Siam. It was the second of twenty wars fought between the Burmese and Siamese that lasted well into the 19th century. The cause of the war was an attempt by the Toungoo king Bayinnaung to force the Ayutthaya kingdom into submission under his rule, as part of his campaign that later created the largest empire ever to exist in Southeast Asia. 13 years into Bayinnaung's reign, his second attempt at invasion of Siam and first as king succeeded after an extensive siege of the city of Ayutthaya. Siam became a vassal of the Toungoo dynasty, this status lasting until a 1568 revolt by Ayutthaya resulting in a short-lived independence.

Prelude to conflict
Following the 1547–49 war with the Toungoo, Ayutthaya king Maha Chakkraphat built up his capital city's defenses in preparation for a later war with the Burmese. The 1547–49 war ended in a Siamese defensive victory and preserved Siamese independence. However, Bayinnaung's territorial ambitions prompted Chakkraphat to prepare for another invasion. These preparations included a census that prepared all able men to go to war. Arms and livestock were taken by the government in preparation for a large-scale war effort, and seven white elephants were captured by Chakkraphat for good luck. News of the Ayutthayan king's preparation spread quickly, eventually reaching the Burmese.

Meanwhile, an attack on the city of Chiang Mai in the nearby Lan Na kingdom by Bayinnaung succeeded in taking the city in 1556. Subsequent efforts left most of northern Siam under Burmese control. This successful invasion resulted in Bayinnaung being given the nickname "Conqueror of Ten Directions". This left Chakkraphat's kingdom in a precarious position, faced with enemy territory to the north and the west.

Invasion

Initial invasion
Bayinnaung, with his quick rise to power and influence, subsequently demanded two of King Chakkraphat's white elephants as tribute to the rising Toungoo Dynasty. Chakkraphat refused, leading to Burma's second invasion of the Ayutthaya Kingdom. King Bayinnaung, familiar with the terrain of Siam due to his prior expeditions with the late Tabinshwehti, entered Siam through what is now known as Three Pagodas Pass in Kanchanaburi Province. A separate Burmese army entered through Mae Lamao Pass in what is now Tak Province.

Capture of Phitsanulok 
Bayinnaung's army consisted of 60,000 men, 2,400 horses, 360 elephants, and another army from Lan Na These forces marched towards the capital city Ayutthaya, but first faced forces at the city of Phitsanulok. The governor of Phitsanulok, Mahathammarachathirat, faced with a large opposing force, betrayed the Siamese cause and signed a treaty of friendship with Bayinnaung, contributing forces to Bayinnaung's now even larger army.

Capture of Sukhothai 
Next, the Burmese army faced the Kingdom of Sukhothai, which by then was in its declining years, having been submitted to Ayutthayan authority as a vassal state for more than 200 years. The Burmese marched into Sukhothai territory, and their ruler, Mahathammarachathirat, soon realized that defending the kingdom was hopeless and also switched allegiance to Bayinnaung in 1563.

Capture of Sawankhalok and Phichit 
Bayinnaung's army took Sawankhalok and Phichit without difficulty, finally able to direct their full attention on invading Ayutthaya.

Siege of Ayutthaya

Siege of Ayutthaya 
The Bayinnaung armies then marched down to Ayutthaya. There, they were kept at bay for weeks by the Siamese fort, aided by three Portuguese warships and artillery batteries at the harbor. The invaders finally captured the Portuguese ships and batteries on 7 February 1564, after which the fort promptly fell.

With a now 60,000 strong force combined with the Phitsanulok army, Bayinnaung reached Ayutthaya's city walls, heavily bombarding the city. Although superior in strength, the Burmese were not able to capture Ayutthaya, but demanded that the Siamese king come out of the city under a flag of truce for peace negotiations. Seeing that his citizens could not take the siege much longer, Chakkraphat negotiated peace, but at a high price.

Siamese surrender terms 
In exchange for the retreat of the Burmese army, Bayinnaung took Prince Ramesuan (Chakkraphat's son), Phraya Chakri, and Phraya Sunthorn Songkhram back with him to Burma as a hostage, and four Siamese white elephants. Mahathamraja, although a betrayer, was to be left as ruler of Phitsanulok and viceroy of Siam. The Ayutthaya Kingdom became a vassal of the Toungoo Dynasty, required to give thirty elephants and three hundred catties of silver to the Burmese yearly. The Burmese were also to be granted access to collect taxes at the port of Mergui, then Siamese territory. Bayinnaung's demand of two white elephants was increased to four. A peace treaty was signed at Wat Na Phra Men (Monastery in Front of the Funeral Pyre). Chakkraphat's accedence to Bayinnaung's demands led to a four-year peace.

Burmese sources say that when Bayinnaung returned to Pegu, he also took Maha Chakkraphat back with him as a hostage, before appointing Mahinthrathirat, a son of Maha Chakkraphat, as vassal king of Ayutthaya, and leaving a garrison of 3,000. Burmese sources continue to say that after having been sent to Pegu for years, Maha Chakkraphat became a monk and Bayinnaung allowed him to return to Ayutthaya. Thai sources, however, merely say that Mahinthrathirat, the second son of Maha Chakkraphat, ascended the throne because his father abdicated and became a monk after this war.

Aftermath
The peace did not last long. In 1568, the Ayutthayans revolted against their Burmese rulers. After advice by Mahathamraja that the Ayutthaya kingdom was too weak to sustain a revolt, Bayinnaung again led Burmese armies into Ayutthaya, resulting in another war with the Siamese.

See also
 Burmese–Siamese wars
 Burma–Thailand relations

References

Burmese–Siamese wars
Wars involving the Ayutthaya Kingdom
Conflicts in 1563
Conflicts in 1564
1563 in Asia
1564 in Asia
First Toungoo Empire